is a Japanese BMX cyclist. He represented his nation Japan at the 2008 Summer Olympics, and later claimed the silver medal in the inaugural men's BMX cycling at the 2010 Asian Games.

Sakamoto qualified for the Japanese squad, as the sole Asian rider, in men's BMX cycling at the 2008 Summer Olympics in Beijing by receiving an invitational berth from the Union Cycliste Internationale (UCI) based on his best performance at the UCI World Championships in Victoria, British Columbia, Canada. After he grabbed a thirty-second seed on the morning prelims with a slowest time of 40.548, Sakamoto scored a total of 19 placing points to mount a seventh spot in his quarterfinal heat, thus eliminating him from the tournament.

At the 2010 Asian Games in Guangzhou, China, Sakamoto held off his teammate Masahiro Sampei to take home the men's BMX silver medal in 31.379, trailing closely behind Hong Kong's Steven Wong by more than a full second.

References

External links
NBC Olympics Profile
 

1982 births
Living people
Japanese male cyclists
BMX riders
Cyclists at the 2008 Summer Olympics
Cyclists at the 2010 Asian Games
Asian Games medalists in cycling
Olympic cyclists of Japan
People from Sakai, Osaka
Sportspeople from Osaka Prefecture
Asian Games silver medalists for Japan
Medalists at the 2010 Asian Games